The Royal Borough of Kingston upon Thames is a borough in southwest London. The main town is Kingston upon Thames and it includes Surbiton, Chessington, Malden Rushett, New Malden and Tolworth. It is the oldest of the four royal boroughs in England. The others are the London boroughs of Kensington and Chelsea and Greenwich, and Windsor and Maidenhead, the site of Windsor Castle. The local authority is Kingston upon Thames London Borough Council.

Districts in the borough
 Berrylands
 Canbury
 Chessington
 Coombe
 Hook
 Kingston upon Thames
 Kingston Vale
 Malden Rushett
 Motspur Park
 New Malden
 Norbiton
 Old Malden
 Surbiton
 Tolworth

Adjacent local government districts
 Elmbridge
 Epsom and Ewell
 Merton
 Mole Valley
 Richmond upon Thames
 Sutton
 Wandsworth

History
Kingston upon Thames, on the south bank of the River Thames has existed for many hundreds of years. Many Roman relics have been found in the surrounding areas. A church has stood on the site of All Saints' Church, in the centre of Kingston, for more than a thousand years. An earlier church was sacked by the Vikings in 1009 AD. Kingston was the site of the coronations of seven Anglo-Saxon monarchs:

 Edward the Elder, son of Alfred the Great, 900AD
 Athelstan, 925AD
 Edmund I, 939AD
 Eadred, 946AD
 Eadwig, 956AD
 Edward the Martyr, 975AD
 Ethelred the Unready, 979AD

The Coronation Stone, on which they are said to have been crowned stands outside the local council offices, the Guildhall. A coin from the reign of each of those kings is set into the base of the stone.

The borough was formed in 1965 by the merger of the Municipal boroughs of Kingston-upon-Thames (which itself was a Royal Borough, transferring that designation to the merged entity), Malden and Coombe and Surbiton. At time of the merger the new borough was transferred from the county of Surrey and added as an administrative part of Greater London. The current name of the borough omits hyphens to distinguish it from the similarly named former municipal borough. Kingston also contains County Hall, the former seat of Surrey County Council.

It was part of Surrey for postal purposes until postal counties were abolished in 1996. Districts mainly use the KT postcode, except from the parts of Ham in the borough which use the TW code, and the Kingston Vale area in the north-east which has an SW15 postcode.

Demography

Ethnicity
The following table shows the ethnic group of respondents in the 2001 and 2011 census in Kingston upon Thames.

Politics

Parliament
The borough includes the whole of the Kingston and Surbiton Parliamentary Constituency and part of the Richmond Park Constituency with both constituencies being created in 1997. The previous constituencies re-arranged to form these two had been essentially Conservative.

In 1997 the Liberal Democrats won both seats. Dr Jenny Tonge took Richmond Park constituency and in 2005 Susan Kramer became its Liberal Democrat MP with a majority of 3,731 but she was beaten in the May 2010 election by Conservative Zac Goldsmith with a majority of 4,091. Goldsmith retained his seat at the 2015 general election, with a greatly increased majority of 23,015. Goldsmith stood as an Independent candidate in the by-election held on 1 December 2016, but was defeated by Sarah Olney, a Liberal Democrat, after the Conservative Party decided not to put forward its own candidate. Goldsmith regained the seat for the Conservatives in the 2017 general election with a significantly reduced majority of 45 votes. Sarah Olney then regained the seat during the 2019 General Election.

In 1997 Edward Davey overturned the previous Conservative majority of more than 10,000 in Kingston and Surbiton, to win by 56 votes after three recounts. He retained the seat in 2001 with a majority of 15,676 over the Conservative candidate David Shaw. In 2005 Davey's majority was 8,961, and in the May 2010 general election he again retained the seat with a slightly reduced majority, beating the Conservative candidate Helen Whately. In the 2015 general election, Davey's seat was taken by Conservative James Berry with a majority of 2,834. Davey's was one of six Liberal Democrat losses in London and 49 overall as the party suffered its worst election results since its formation in 1988. Davey regained the seat in the 2017 general election.

Local government

The Borough Council was controlled by the Conservative Party from 1965 to 1986, when a short-lived SDP-Liberal Alliance minority administration took over. It lost several by-elections due to its attempt to abolish the Borough's grammar school system. The Conservatives regained control in 1987. The 1990 election gave no party a majority but the Conservatives kept power with the casting vote of the Mayor.

In 2011, Councillor Tim Dennen resigned from the Liberal Democrat group to sit as an independent member.

On Tuesday 11 June 2013 Derek Osborne was arrested on suspicion of possessing indecent images of children, following his release on bail he resigned the Liberal Democrat group, as leader of Kingston Council and as a councillor for Beverley Ward. Osborne pleaded guilty and was subsequently jailed for 2 years in October 2013. The Conservatives comfortably won the by-election following the resignation of the former leader of the council.

In 2014 the Conservatives gained a majority of 8 at the local elections, bucking a trend of the Liberal Democrats retaining control in their heartlands.

The Liberal Democrats regained control of the council in 2018 with a large majority of 39 seats compared to the Conservatives' 9 seats.

Modern Kingston

Kingston benefits from one of the biggest and most visited shopping areas outside of central London, with a varied selection of high street stores, and a large number of independent boutiques and retailers.

The most famous shop in Kingston is Bentalls, started by Frank Bentall in 1867 in Clarence Street, where it (or at least the completely rebuilt Bentall Centre) stands.

Close to Kingston, and located between Kingston, Richmond and Roehampton, is Richmond Park, one of the oldest of London's royal parks.

The borough is home to the highest number of South Koreans in Europe, in the town of New Malden.

Tourism in Kingston

Kingston has many attractions in and near it, ranging from nature and historical attractions to theme parks.

Some of the borough's attractions are:
 Chessington World of Adventures. Resort in the south of the borough. The closest railway station is Chessington South. Chessington is one of the UK's premier theme parks attracting thousands of visitors from all around the UK to its rides, aquarium and zoo.
 Thames Riverside. A walkway beside the Thames at Kingston and Surbiton, it has a variety of restaurants.
 Coronation Stone. Situated outside The Guildhall in Kingston, this ancient rock was the crowning point of some of England's early kings.
 Richmond Park. One of the world's largest urban parks, its Kingston Gate is situated within the borough's boundary. 
 Kingston Town Centre. One of London's biggest shopping destinations, with hundreds of shops, cafes and restaurants, as well as a large entertainment complex, including an Odeon Cinema and Tenpin Bowling. Also in the town centre is a historic market which has been running for hundreds of years.
 Rose Theatre. An 822-seat theatre in the centre of Kingston.
 Bentall Centre (a shopping centre). It is home to over 75 shops (including the Bentalls department store), restaurants and other services.

Economy
Kingston is the 3rd largest retail centre by employment, in London.

Sega Amusements International, responsible for the production of arcade games outside Japan, has its head office in Chessington, Royal Borough of Kingston upon Thames. Lidl relocated its UK Headquarters to Kingston in 2020.

Industry
Sopwith Aviation Company had a factory in the Canbury Park area of Kingston, where the famous Sopwith Camel was produced during World War I. The Hawker Hurricane was designed in a site in Kingston town centre and built in the aviation factory near Ham now known as the Hawker Centre.

Education 
Primary responsibility for education in the borough lies with the local education authority.

Schools

Free schools:
The Kingston Academy (mixed), Richmond Road, Kingston upon Thames, KT2 5PE

Academy schools:
Chessington School (mixed), Garrison Lane, Chessington KT9 2JS
Coombe Boys’ School, College Gardens, Blakes Lane, New Malden KT3 6NU
Coombe Girls’ School, Clarence Avenue, New Malden KT3 3TU
The Hollyfield School and Sixth Form Centre (mixed), Surbiton Hill Road, Surbiton KT6 4TU
Holy Cross School (girls) (Roman Catholic), Sandal Road, New Malden KT3 5AR
Richard Challoner School (boys) (Roman Catholic), Manor Drive North, New Malden KT3 5PE
Southborough High School (boys), Hook Road, Surbiton KT6 5AS
Tiffin Girls’ School, Richmond Road, Kingston upon Thames KT2 5PL
Tiffin School (boys), Queen Elizabeth Road, Kingston upon Thames KT2 6RL
Tolworth Girls’ School and Sixth Form, Fullers Way North, Surbiton KT6 7LQ

Further education
Kingston College
Hillcroft College

Higher education
Kingston University

Transport
Kingston has nine South Western Railway stations and two centrally located bus stations, but no London Underground or other Transport for London stations. In 2008, 64 bus routes served Kingston.

Railway

Coaching interests in Kingston opposed the plan of the London and Southampton Railway to run its line to Southampton near Kingston. The line consequently avoided the town with a station opened in 1838 southwest of the town; it was later resited to the present site of Surbiton station.

In 1863 a branch was built from Twickenham to a terminus in Kingston. That line was extended to the main line in 1869 to form the Kingston Loop Line.

All rail services in the borough are operated by South Western Railway, who provide regular services to and from London Waterloo.

Railway stations in the borough:
, London Zone 5
, London Zone 6
, London Zone 6
Kingston, London Zone 6
, London Zone 4
, London Zone 4
, London Zone 5
, London Zone 6
, London Zone 5

Travel to work
In March 2011, the main forms of transport that residents used to travel to work were: driving a car or van, 26.1% of all residents aged 16–74; train, 7.1%; bus, minibus or coach, 7.1%; on foot, 6.9%; work mainly at or from home, 4.3%; bicycle, 2.8%; underground, metro, light rail, tram, 2.5%.

Coat of arms

The Kingston coat of arms displays three salmon and its shield is almost identical to the coat of arms of the Swedish municipality of Laholm. Both coats of arms can be traced back to the 16th century. The arms of the Norwegian town of Mandal is also similar, but more recent.

In 1966 the newly created London Borough added a set crests and supporters taken from the localities merged into it. The crest came from the Municipal Borough of Malden and Coombe, with the with that Borough's arms hung from the neck of the stag, and the supporters taken from Municipal Borough of Surbiton, with again it's arms hanging from the stags neck.

International links
Although not officially 'twinned', The Royal Borough of Kingston has a partner city of Oldenburg in Germany and Gwanak-gu, an administrative subdivision of Seoul, in South Korea. Some road signs announce that Kingston is linked with Delft in the Netherlands but this official link has ended.

Sport and leisure
The Borough of Kingston upon Thames has several football clubs in its area:

 Kingstonian a Non-League football club who play at King George's Field
 Corinthian Casuals a Non-League football club who play at King George's Field
 Chessington & Hook United a Non-League football club who play at Chalky Lane
 Epsom Athletic a defunct Non-League football club who play at Chalky Lane
 Chelsea F.C. Women who play at the Kingsmeadow Stadium in WSL 1

References

External links

 Kingston upon Thames Council

 
Kingston upon Thames
Kingston upon Thames
1965 establishments in the United Kingdom
Places with royal patronage in London